The Mercedes-Benz R129 SL is a roadster which was produced by Mercedes-Benz from 1989 until 2001. The R129 replaced the R107 in 1989 and was in its turn replaced by the R230 SL-Class in 2002 for the 2003 model year.

The R129 was offered as a two-door roadster with an automated (electro-hydraulic), fabric convertible roof; colour-matched, automated tonneau cover; and a manually detachable hardtop that could be fitted over the stored fabric convertible roof and tonneau. It was available with a variety of powertrains across its twelve-year production, including a V12 option used in the SL600.

Development and launch 
Designed in 1984, the R129 was based on the shortened floorpan of the Mercedes-Benz W124. The new SL-class was presented at the Geneva Motor Show in March 1989, with left-hand drive sales beginning that summer and right-hand drive sales in the autumn. It came runner-up behind the Citroen XM for the European Car of the Year accolade.

Models

Model history
Designed in 1984, the R129 was based on the shortened floorpan of the Mercedes-Benz W124 and featured many innovative details for the time, for instance electronically controlled damping (Adaptive Damping System ADS, optional) and a hidden, automatically extending roll-over bar. The R107's somewhat dated rear suspension with semi-trailing arms gave way to a modern multi-link axle. The number of standard features was high, with electric action for the windows, mirrors, seats and hydraulic convertible top.

This car has a distinction of being the first passenger vehicle to have seat belts integrated into the seats as opposed to anchoring to the floor, B-pillar, and transmission tunnel.

Starting in 1993 for the 1994 model year, R129 were re-designated. For example, 500 SL became SL 500. Starting in model year 1994, Mercedes-Benz offered special SL models from time to time, such as the Mille Miglia edition cars of model year 1994 or the SL edition of model year 2000.

1994 cars (for 1995 model year) had minor updates for the car
Odometer switched from mechanical to electronic
Option for portable cell phone with voice activated dialling
Clear front turn signal indicators for US SPEC models
Bose stereo now standard, rear speakers and subwoofer

1995 onwards R129s for the 1996 model year featured a minor facelift for the car:
Front wing vents updated; only 2 rounded slots, rather than 3 squared slots
Bumpers are now body colour
V8 and V12 upgraded to 5 speed electronic transmission; previous transmission was hydraulic 4-speed
Xenon HID headlamps standard on SL 600, optional on SL 500
Addition of side airbags

During 1996 for model year 1997, cars were the first year to have an option of the panoramic roof. Also newly available:
A new front-seat occupant-detection sensor could deactivate the right-side airbag when it determined that the passenger seat held less than 26 pounds
"Sport" package became an option
Automatic rain-sensing windshield wipers standard
Three-way programmable garage door opener "HomeLink" transmitters built into the rear-view mirror
Replaced the earlier climate control panel with one with a much larger LCD
Remote control uses dual infrared (IR) and radio (RF) control

A second facelift occurred in 1998 for model year 1999 which featured:
V8 engine switch from M119 to M113
Soft Nappa leather seats replace the perforated leather seats
New steering wheel design
Body colour door handles
Taillights with curved faces replacing the classic square ribbed lights
17-inch wheels standard: Wheels are now 8.25 x 17" with 245/45ZR17 tyres. Sport package is 8" (front) and 9" (rear) x 18" with 245/40 and 275/35 tyres respectively.
Fiber-Optic digital audio links to the CD player instead of analogue copper
One-touch starting- called "Tip-start". Once the key is turned, the engine cranks on its own until it catches and starts.
Instrument cluster now has silver rings around each gauge
Oil pressure gauge replaced by oil temperature
Different engine vanity cover
Removed the automatic lock on the left rear storage compartment which houses the Bose subwoofer
Passenger side storage net on transmission tunnel

Engine history

Initially, there were three different engines available,
300 SL with a M103 3.0 L 12-valve SOHC I6 ( at 5,700 rpm),
300 SL-24 with a M104 3.0 L 24-valve DOHC I6 ( at 6,300 rpm),
500 SL with a M119 5.0 L 32-valve DOHC V8 ( at 5,500 rpm),
and joined in July 1992 by the
600 SL with a M120 6.0 L 48-valve DOHC V12 ( at 5,200 rpm).

There was a choice of 5-speed manual or 4–5 speed automatic for the six-cylinder cars; the V8 and V12 could only be ordered with a 4-speed automatic gearbox.

In autumn 1993 Mercedes-Benz rearranged names and models. Also, the 300 SL and 300 SL-24 were respectively replaced by:
SL 280 with a M104 2.8 L 24-valve DOHC I6 ( at 5,500 rpm),
SL 320 with a M104 3.2 L 24-valve DOHC I6 ( at 5,500 rpm).
Only the 280 was available with a manual gearbox. SL 500 and 600 continued with their respective engines.

A second facelift, introduced in late 1998, comprised new external mirrors, 17" wheels and new bumpers. Also new were the engines,
SL 280 with a M112 2.8 L 18-valve SOHC V6 ( at 5700 rpm),
SL 320 with a M112 3.2 L 18-valve SOHC V6 ( at 5,600 rpm),
SL 500 with a M113 5.0 L 24-valve SOHC V8 ( at 5,600 rpm).
The V12 engine remained unchanged.

Australian market

The new Mercedes Benz R129 roadster was first introduced into the Australian market with the 300SL and 500SL models with only the eight cylinder variant being available throughout the entire production run of the R129 model 1989-2001.

The six cylinder 300SL 24 was replaced in 1995 by the SL 280 and finally the SL 320 in 1999 and the twelve cylinder 600SL first arrived in 1993 changing to SL 600 in 1995 with the last SL 600 being delivered in 2000.

Only 38 cars of the 600SL/SL 600 were delivered to the Australian market.

North American market
Not all engines were offered in North America. The 1990 Mercedes-Benz SL base model was the 228 hp 300 SL version (European 300 SL-24) equipped with a five-speed manual or five-speed automatic transmission, but it was the 322 hp 500 SL (with a 5.0-litre V8 engine) which made the most headlines. For model year 1993, the 600 SL was additionally introduced stateside.

The SL 320 replaced the 300 SL in the United States in 1994, but the SL 280 was not offered. The 6-cylinder SLs were dropped from the US lineup in 1998, leaving just the V8 and V12.

Chassis

1990–1995
Front suspension Independent damper struts with separate coil springs and gas-pressurised shock absorbers, triangular lower control arms with anti-dive geometry and stabiliser bar.

Rear suspension Independent 5-arm multilink with separate single-tube gas-pressurised shock absorbers and coil springs, geometry for anti-lift, anti-squat and alignment control, stabiliser bar.

Wheels 8.0Jx16H2 aluminium alloy and regular.

Tyres 225/55 ZR 16 steel-belted radial.

Brakes 2-circuit hydraulic power-assisted 4-wheel discs. Antilock Braking System (ABS).

1996–1997
Body construction Monocoque with front and rear crumple zones and removable hardtop.

Front suspension Independent damper strut with anti-dive geometry and stabiliser bar. Separate shock absorbers and coil springs. Negative-offset steering.

Rear suspension Independent 5-arm multilink with geometry for anti-lift, anti-squat and alignment control and stabiliser bar. Separate shock absorbers and coil springs.

Steering Recirculating ball with speed-sensitive power assist and hydraulic damper. Steering wheel turns (lock-to-lock) 3.0.

Tyres Steel-belted radials. Performance 225/55ZR16.

Wheels aluminium alloy 8.0Jx16 H2.

Brakes 2-circuit hydraulic power-assisted 4-wheel disc. Ventilated front, solid rear brake discs.

Antilock Braking System (ABS) ABS senses impending wheel lock-up under heavy braking and pumps the front brakes individually or the rear brakes together (to help maintain stability), as needed, up to 30 times per second to prevent lock-up and maintain steering ability.

Dimensions

1990–1995

300 SL
Wheelbase 99.0 in

Boot capacity 7.9 cu ft

Fuel capacity 79.9 L – 21.1 gal (US) 17.5 gal (Imp)

500 SL
Wheelbase 99.0 in

Boot capacity 7.9 cu ft

Fuel capacity 79.8 L – 21.1 gal

600 SL
Wheelbase 99.0 in

Curb weight 2020 kg – 4,455 lb

Boot capacity 7.9 cu ft

Fuel capacity 79.8l 21.1 gal

Special editions

AMG offerings

AMG had already offered an SL version while still independent, the AMG 500 SL 6.0 of 1991. After being taken over by Daimler-Benz, there were several AMG SL-models available through D-B dealers.

The SL 60 AMG was the most numerous of these rare cars. Sold from 1993 to 1998, it used a  V8 engine producing  at 5,500 rpm. AMG claimed a 0– speed of 5.4 seconds.

Only 85 cars were made.

It was a bored out version of M120 6.0 V12 and with a longer stroke. Produced between 1996 and 1997 in 150 units.

The SL 55 AMG was sold in the R129 body style from 1998 to 2001 in limited numbers (5.4L V8,  at 5,500 rpm). It was the predecessor of the production R230 SL 55 AMG sold later, albeit was normally aspirated in the R129 and not supercharged as in its R230 successor. 65 cars were made.

Only about 300 cars in the SL-class were customised by AMG prior to the 2003 model year.

Mille Miglia Edition
In 1995 Mercedes released the Mille Miglia edition, to commemorate the 40th anniversary of Stirling Moss's win of the 1955 Mille Miglia road race. The limited edition was available in either SL 280, SL 320, or SL 500 guise; came in Brilliant Silver metallic; and had Evo II six-spoke polished alloys, red and black leather interior, carbon-fibre trim and extra equipment. Stirling Moss was given the first SL 500 built. According to the brochure of this special edition, only 600 pieces were to be built, however only 40 were built.

Silver Arrow Edition

A special edition of 2002 SL 500/SL 600 was made to celebrate the 1930s Silver Arrow race car. It had full AMG body package, painted in Silver Arrow only special 777 metallic paint, special Silver Arrow designation on interior and exterior badging, two-tone silver and black interior, leather on steering wheel and seats, Silver Arrow illuminated sill plates, Silver Arrow leather bordered floor mats, special dark wood, and special BBS 2 piece wheels with polished stainless steel beauty rings. For the US market, only 1550 Silver Arrow units were produced; 100 units of the SL 600 and 1450 units of the SL 500. For the UK market, just 100 Silver Arrows were made, all of which were SL 500 models.

Other editions
Several other editions were released of the 129 body SL. These include:
40th Anniversary Roadster Edition (1997)
La Costa Edition (1997)
Sport model SL 320 included AMG staggered tire setup (1997)
Special Edition (1998)
Final Edition (2000)
SL Edition (2000)
Designo Slate Blue Edition (North America, 2000-01)
Designo Black Diamond Edition (North America, 2000-01)
F1 Edition (2001)

Media attention

The R129 received heightened media attention in 1991 for two reasons. 

Diana, Princess of Wales sold her Jaguar XJS to lease a metallic-red 500 SL and became the first member of the royal family to use a foreign car. This was not without controversy as it sparked a media storm as it questioned whether a member of the British royal family should drive a foreign car. Media pressure eventually forced her to return the car to Mercedes-Benz in 1992. It now resides in the Mercedes-Benz Museum.

Victor Chang, Companion of the Order of Australia and  Australian of the Century (People's Choice Awards) was a pioneer of modern heart transplantation, fatally shot while driving his 500SL in Sydney.

Additionally, this is the car driven by Mark Morrison in the music video of his 1996 song Return of the Mack.

References

External links 
 Mercedes R129 SL Digital Brochures

R129
R129
Roadsters
Cars introduced in 1989
1990s cars
2000s cars
Cars discontinued in 2001